Bertold Reissig (born 1877) was a German stage and film actor.

Selected filmography
 The Crazy Marriage of Laló (1918)
 The Mirror of the World (1918)
 People to Each Other (1926)
 Sister Veronika (1927)
 The Catwalk (1927)
 The Old Fritz (1928)
 Different Morals (1931)
 Chauffeur Antoinette (1932)
 Princess Turandot (1934)
 The Higher Command (1935)
 Across the Desert (1936)
 Madame Bovary (1937)
 Truxa (1937)
 Kitty and the World Conference (1939)

References

Bibliography 
 Goble, Alan. The Complete Index to Literary Sources in Film. Walter de Gruyter, 1999.

External links 
 

1877 births
Year of death unknown
German male film actors
German male silent film actors
20th-century German male actors
German male stage actors
Male actors from Hamburg